Hilmar Björnsson (born 13 May 1969) is an Icelandic former football player who made three appearances for the Iceland national football team. He now works as a television producer in Iceland and owns the only Golf television station in Iceland.

External links

1969 births
Living people
Hilmar Bjornsson
Hilmar Bjornsson
Hilmar Bjornsson
Allsvenskan players
Hilmar Bjornsson
Helsingborgs IF players
Hilmar Bjornsson
Expatriate footballers in Sweden
Association football midfielders